Select a region on the graphical atlas to view a list of the fossiliferous stratigraphic units in that area of Canada.

Graphical atlas

See also

Geology of Canada
Canada
Canada geology-related lists